Mitochondrial transcription termination factor 1, also known as MTERF1, is a protein which in humans is encoded by the MTERF gene.

This gene encodes a mitochondrial transcription termination factor. This protein participates in attenuating transcription from the mitochondrial genome; this attenuation allows higher levels of expression of 16S ribosomal RNA relative to the tRNA gene downstream. The product of this gene has three leucine zipper motifs bracketed by two basic domains that are all required for DNA binding. There is evidence that, for this protein, the zippers participate in intramolecular interactions that establish the three-dimensional structure required for DNA binding.

References

Further reading